Amasia may refer to the following places:

 Amasya, a city in Northern Turkey
 Amasya Province, which contains the city
 Amasea (titular see), the former Metropolitan Archbishopric with see there, now a Latin Catholic titular see
 Amasia, Shirak, a town in Armenia
 Amasia District, a former administrative district of Soviet Armenia and later of the Republic of Armenia
 Amasia, Armavir, a town in Armenia
 A Latin name for the Ems (river), a river in Germany and the Netherlands
 Amasia (continent), a projection for the Earth's next supercontinent